4630 Bochum is the fifth studio album released by German rock/pop singer Herbert Grönemeyer. It was released on 14 August 1984 by EMI.

Recording 
4630 Bochum was recorded between January and March 1984 in EMI studios in Cologne. It was his first album for EMI after the end of his contract with Intercord Tonträger GmbH (a record label owned by Verlagsgruppe Georg von Holtzbrinck).

The album spent 79 weeks in the German albums chart, making it the most successful album of 1984 in Germany. With certified sales in excess of 2.5 million, it is currently the third-best-selling album in Germany, having been certified quintuple platinum. In Switzerland and Austria, the album spent 13 and 24 weeks respectively in the charts. The single release "Männer" in particular established Grönemeyer's fame in Germany.

The cover shows the title hand-written in the style of an address in white chalk on a black background:
Herbert
Grönemeyer
4630 Bochum
At the time, 4630 was the postal code for the city of Bochum where Grönemeyer grew up and had worked as a musician.

Track listing 
 "Bochum" – 3:50 
 "Männer" – 4:00 
 "Flugzeuge im Bauch" – 3:54
 "Alkohol" – 4:29
 "Amerika" – 3:26
 "Für Dich da" – 3:23
 "Jetzt oder nie" – 4:57
 "Fangfragen" – 4:17
 "Erwischt" – 4:01
 "Mambo" – 2:45

Personnel 
 Herbert Grönemeyer – vocals, choir, piano
 Detlef Kessler – drums
 Alfred Kritzer – piano, trumpet
 Norbert Hamm – bass
 Jakob Hansonis – guitars
 Gaggy Mrozeck – guitars
 Charlie Mariano – saxophone

Cover versions 
 1989 Männer a-cappella by Bläck Fööss
 1995 Männer, titled Frauen by JBO
 1998 Flugzeuge im Bauch by Oli.P and Xavier Naidoo (DE #1, AT #1, CH #1)
 1999 Mambo, titled Mamboleo by Loona
 2012 Flugzeuge im Bauch by Katja Friedenberg on The Voice of Germany (DE #41)

Charts

Weekly charts

Year-end charts

Certifications

External links 
 Singt Grönemeyer wirklich 'tief im Westen'? . Der Westen, 15 August 2008. A comparison of the song's lyrics with everyday life in Bochum

References 

1984 albums
German-language albums
EMI Records albums
Herbert Grönemeyer albums
Pages translated from German Wikipedia